L'Art (délicat) de la séduction (The (Delicate) Art of Seduction) is a 2001 French film directed by Richard Berry. The soundtrack for the film was composed by Éric Serra.

Plot

The film follows Etienne (Patrick Timsit), a 40-year-old car designer, who takes time off from work to study sexual mastery from a Zen master (Alain Chabat) and several prostitutes, in the hopes of having the sexual skill to impress Laure (Cécile de France). Laure, a blonde who was introduced to him by his friend Jacques (Richard Berry), told Etienne on January 1 that she will not have sex with him until May 27 that year at precisely 9pm.

Cast

Patrick Timsit as Etienne
Cécile de France as Laure
Richard Berry as Jacques
Alain Chabat as Maître Zen
Jean-Pierre Darroussin as Monsieur Hubert
Ludmila Mikaël as Alice
Guilaine Londez as Real estate agent

Reception

Lisa Nesselson from Variety gave a negative review of the film, stating it played "like a tepid cross between 'Rocky' and any number of prick-teasing comedies".

References

External links
 
 
 

2001 films
French romantic comedy films
Films directed by Richard Berry
Films scored by Éric Serra
2000s French films